Esmail Kola-ye Bozorg (also Romanized as Esmā‘īl Kolā-ye Bozorg; also known as A‘eyl Kolā-ye Bozorg) is a village in Hasan Reza Rural District, in the Central District of Juybar County, Mazandaran Province, Iran. At the 2006 census, its population was 406, in 105 families.

References 

Populated places in Juybar County